Isser Woloch (born 1937) is the Moore Collegiate Professor Emeritus of History at Columbia. His work focuses on the French Revolution and on Napoleon.

He was educated at Columbia (A.B., 1959) and at Princeton (Ph.D., 1965). He was the winner of the Leo Gershoy Award of the American Historical Association in 1994.

Selected publications
Woloch, Isser (1970), Jacobin Legacy: The Democratic Movement under the Directory, Princeton University Press.

References

External links
 Isser Woloch: Moore Collegiate Professor Emeritus of History
 

1937 births
Living people
Date of birth missing (living people)
21st-century American historians
21st-century American male writers
Columbia University faculty
Columbia College (New York) alumni
Princeton University alumni
Historians of the French Revolution
American male non-fiction writers